Sudden Attack 2 (Korean: 서든어택 2) was a free-to-play multiplayer first-person shooter online game developed by the South Korean company GameHi (Nexon GT). It is a sequel to the original Sudden Attack. The game was launched in 2016 but was shutdown just 86 days after its launch due to an end of contract with the game's developer. There were plans for a Japanese launch but these never materialized since the abrupt shutdown of the game's servers.

Gameplay
The game featured much of the same modes and play styles from the original game with added customization for characters and a newer game engine which allowed for more updated graphics.

Development
The game was developed by the same developer of the original game, GameHi. After its initial launch, the developers had decided to cancel their contract with Nexon to publish the game resulting in the game's development halting. Besides the contract cancellation, the over sexualization of the game's main female characters resulted in backlash from gamers who felt it was inappropriate and over the top. The reaction led to the studio apologizing for the appearance of the characters and removing them entirely from the game. Both the controversy and contract disputes led to the game being terminated just days after launching. There were news before that the original developer might find another publisher to publish the game.

References

External links
 Official site for South Korea 
 Official site for Japan 

2016 video games
Video games developed in South Korea
Inactive massively multiplayer online games
Windows games
Windows-only games
Unreal Engine games